Sauveterre de Comminges XIII, nicknamed Les Frelons (Hornets), are a French Rugby league club based in Sauveterre-de-Comminges, Haute-Garonne, in the Midi-Pyrénées region. They play in the French National Division 1.

History 

The first mention of Les Frelons came in 2006 when the club reached the National Division 2, then called the Federal Division, league final and won 20-14 against former top flight club Tonneins XIII earning themselves promotion. In 2007 they won the Coupe Falcou. In the National Division 1 the club did well they reached the final in 2011 but lost to Tonneins XIII 16-20, who they also lost out to in the Paul Dejean Cup 23-27, the following season they also reached the league final this time they won beating Ornaisons XIII 28-4, and by a massive coincidence they also played Ornaisons XIII in the Paul Dejean Cup final winning 24-16. The club declined the offer of promotion to the 2nd tier Elite Two Championship.

Honours 

 National Division 1 (1): 2011-12
 National Division 2 (Federal Division) (1): 2005-06
 Coupe Falcou (1): 2007
 Paul Dejean Cup (1): 2012

See also 

National Division 1

External links 

 Website

French rugby league teams
Rugby clubs established in 2006